We the Best Forever is the fifth studio album by American disc jockey and record producer DJ Khaled. It was released under We the Best Music Group, Terror Squad Entertainment, Young Money Entertainment, Cash Money Records, and Universal Motown Records on July 19, 2011 instead of June 28, 2011. It is his first album to be released on a major label, his first four albums being released on the independent label Koch Records, which later changed its name to E1 Music.

Background
Khaled announced via Twitter on August 16, 2010 that the album would be titled We the Best Forever. On August 19, 2010, three days after announcing the album title he announced he had signed with Cash Money Records. On December 7, 2010 Khaled said the album was 75% done.

Khaled confirmed in September 2010 that the people he's made past hits with including, Birdman, Lil Wayne, would be featured on the project. Khaled revealed that he really wanted Eminem featured on one of his "street anthems" and asked Eminem to "do it for hip hop music as a whole." In February 2011 Khaled confirmed that Drake, Rick Ross, T-Pain, and Plies will be featured in the album. In April 2011, Khaled revealed additional guest appearances, including Fabolous, Young Jeezy, Fat Joe, Ace Hood, B.o.B, Cee Lo Green, Keyshia Cole, Ne-Yo, Chris Brown, and Akon. On his first webisode Khaled confirmed production from The Runners on the album. This is the first DJ Khaled album since his debut to feature production by DJ Khaled himself.

Singles
Khaled originally announced the first single would feature Lil Wayne. The album's first single "Welcome to My Hood" featuring Rick Ross, Plies, Lil Wayne, and T-Pain, and produced by The Renegades, Cubic Z, DJ Nasty & LVM, and Khaled was released on January 18, 2011. It peaked on the Billboard Hot 100 at number seventy-nine. On February 10, 2011, the music video was released for "Welcome to My Hood" featuring Rick Ross, Plies, Lil Wayne, and T-Pain. On April 27, 2011, the music video was released for the "Welcome to My Hood" (Remix) featuring T-Pain, Ludacris, Busta Rhymes, Twista, Mavado, Birdman, Ace Hood, The Game, Fat Joe, Jadakiss, Bun B and Waka Flocka Flame.

On May 12, 2011, Khaled premiered the second single titled "I'm On One" featuring Drake, Rick Ross and Lil Wayne and produced by T-Minus, Noah "40" Shebib, and Kromatik. It was released in the United States for digital download on May 20, 2011, and was released to U.S mainstream radio on August 23. It debuted on the Billboard Hot 100 at number seventy-eight, and has since peaked at number ten, becoming his then highest peaking song on the chart. On June 26, 2011, the music video was released for "I'm On One" featuring Drake, Rick Ross and Lil Wayne.

The next single with a video to be released is Infinity-produced "It Ain't Over Til It's Over", featuring Mary J. Blige, Fabolous, and Jadakiss, released on iTunes on July 8. The next day, the official music video for "It Ain't Over Til It's Over" was premiered.  The song was  released to U.S. Rhythmic radio on August 30.

The fourth single is "Legendary", featuring R&B singers Chris Brown, Keyshia Cole, and Ne-Yo. It was produced by DJ Nasty, Cubic Z & LVM, and was released to U.S. Rhythmic radio on October 4, 2011.

Reception

Critical reception

We the Best Forever was met with generally positive reviews from music critics. At Metacritic, which assigns a normalized rating out of 100 to reviews from mainstream critics, the album received an average score of 61, based on 7 reviews, indicating "generally favorable reviews ". Amanda Bassa of HipHopDX gave the album three out of five stars, saying "At this point listeners are either down with his movement or they aren't, and while We The Best Forever is a solid piece, it's not different enough from his previous work to change any minds about him. But with emcees ranging from Jadakiss to B.o.B., there really is a little something on his latest LP to satisfy just about anyone who enjoys mainstream Hip Hop." AllMusic editor David Jeffries gave the album three and a half stars out of five, saying "We the Best Forever may be DJ Khaled's first release for the Cash Money label, but little else has changed. The good news is that the ringleader's formula of rounding up superstar talent for an album jammed with potential singles still works, unless you think everything on 2011 radio is trash and that big money ruined hip-hop." Adam Fleischer of XXL gave the album an XL, saying "Though the content of We The Best Forever is what we've come to expect from a DJ Khaled offering—grandiose odes to the grind and getting yours—that he understands how to create those better than most is what makes a DJ Khaled track, and album, worthwhile."

Jody Rosen of Rolling Stone gave the album three out of five stars, saying "As usual, his imperial victory-march hip-hop songs are fun, and mildly exhausting." Kevin Ritchie of Now gave the album two out of five stars, saying "DJ Khaled's fifth curatorial compilation of posse raps is a forgettable snapshot of mainstream hip-hop despite an all-star roster of emcees, R&B singers and producers. An industry fixture, the Miami radio DJ and Terror Squad member takes few stylistic chances, making We The Best Forever a mostly tedious listen despite its flashes of lyrical invention." PopMatters contributor David Amidon gave the album a four out of ten, saying "It's certainly worth noting that We the Best Forever is Khaled’s most complete album since its namesake, for whatever that may be worth to you, and despite all kinds of reasons provided to do otherwise (Khaled actually spitting a verse on "Sleep When I’m Gone" comes to mind) it's not an incredible struggle to listen to a Khaled album front-to-back for once."

Commercial performance
The album debuted at number five on the Billboard 200, selling 53,000 copies its first week.

Track listing

Notes
 signifies a co-producer
 signifies an additional producer

Sample Credits
"It Ain't Over Til It's Over" contains a sample of Life After Death's "B.I.G. Interlude" by The Notorious B.I.G. which samples "P.S.K. What Does It Mean?" by Schooly D.
"Welcome To My Hood" contains a sample of "Sound of da Police" by KRS-One.

Charts

Weekly charts

Year-end charts

See also
 List of number-one rap albums of 2011 (U.S.)

References

2011 albums
DJ Khaled albums
Cash Money Records albums
Young Money Entertainment albums
Universal Motown Records albums
Albums produced by Boi-1da
Albums produced by Danja (record producer)
Albums produced by DJ Khalil
Albums produced by Lex Luger
Albums produced by Noah "40" Shebib
Albums produced by T-Minus (record producer)
Albums produced by the Runners
Albums produced by DJ Khaled